This is a list of watercourses in the Australian Capital Territory. It includes all rivers, streams, brooks, creeks, gullies, anabranches, backwaters, and any other watercourses with a gazetted name.

This list is complete with respect to the 1996 Gazetteer of Australia. Dubious names have been checked against the online 2004 data, and in all cases confirmed correct. However, if any watercourses have been gazetted or deleted since 1996, this list does not reflect these changes. Strictly speaking, Australian place names are gazetted in capital  accordance with normal capitalisation conventions. Locations are as gazetted; obviously some watercourses may extend over long distances.

References

Australian Capital Territory
W